Harry Von der Horst (c. 1850 – July 28, 1905) was an executive in Major League Baseball and a former owner of the Baltimore Orioles and Brooklyn Superbas.  He was one of the principal founders and owners of the old 19th century Baltimore Orioles ballclub and when the team was running out of steam he managed to engineer a merger with the Brooklyn team.  This move enabled him to get a significant share of the team and exert enough influence to convince the Brooklyn ownership group to hire his manager, Ned Hanlon. He eventually sold his interest in the team, but remained as the club secretary until his death in 1905 at age 54 from heart failure.

References

Further reading
Books

Other
Obituary in The New York Times
Dodgers historical essay at MLB.com
Ned Hanlon biography mentioning Von der Horst at SABR.org

Year of birth missing
1905 deaths
Baseball executives
Brooklyn Dodgers executives
Sportspeople from Baltimore